Banatski Sokolac is a village located in the Plandište municipality, in the South Banat District of Serbia. It is situated in the Autonomous Province of Vojvodina. The village has a Serb ethnic majority (91,80%) and its population numbered 366 at the 2002 census. Sokolac is the site of the annual Rockvillage festival held in the local school yard; for this occasion many former residents pay a visit.

A statue of Bob Marley was placed in the village in September 2008.

Historical population
1961: 728
1971: 622
1981: 458
1991: 369
2002: 366

See also
List of places in Serbia
List of cities, towns and villages in Vojvodina

References
Slobodan Ćurčić, Broj stanovnika Vojvodine, Novi Sad, 1996.

External links
Rockvillage
Bob Marley statue

Populated places in Serbian Banat
Populated places in South Banat District
Plandište